Four Steps in the Clouds is a 1942 Italian comedy-drama film directed by Alessandro Blasetti, starring Gino Cervi and Adriana Benetti. It tells the story of a married man who agrees to act as the husband of a young pregnant woman who has been abandoned by her boyfriend. Aesthetically, it is close to Italian neorealism. It was shot at Cinecittà Studios in Rome. The film's sets were designed by Virgilio Marchi.

It was nominated for BAFTA as Best Film from any Source. The movie was remade several times, including as A Walk in the Clouds in 1995.

Plot
The story deals with a married agent for a candy manufacturer, played by Gino Cervi. He leads a stable, if somewhat boring, family life in a large unnamed city in the North of Italy.

While travelling on a South bound train on company business, he sees a young woman about to be put off by the conductor. She has no ticket and cannot afford to buy one. The agent helps her stay on the train, and she asks if he could do one more favour for her. She has just been abandoned by her boyfriend upon becoming pregnant and she is now on her way back to the family farm. She has nowhere else to go but is certain that her father will throw her out as soon as he realizes that she is unmarried.

She is terrified and begs the agent to come home with her and pass himself off as her husband. The deception needs only last a couple of days, after which he can go back to his normal life and job and she can claim to have been abandoned. The agent decides that taking a couple of days off work is a small price to pay for saving the girl's honour for the rest of her life and gets off the train with her.

Arriving on the farm, the agent finds it hard to maintain the lie, but in an impassioned speech, convinces the girl's father to let her stay at home. After which, he goes back to his wife and family without mentioning the incident.

Cast
Gino Cervi as Paolo Bianchi 
Adriana Benetti as Maria 
Giuditta Rissone as Clara Bianchi 
Carlo Romano as Antonio, l'autista della corriera 
Guido Celano as Pasquale – Fratello di Maria 
Margherita Seglin as Luisa, madre di Maria e Pasquale 
Aldo Silvani as Luca, padre di Maria e Pasquale 
Mario Siletti as Il fattorino della corriera 
Oreste Bilancia as Il droghiere di Campolo 
Gildo Bocci as Il contadino sulla corriera 
Arturo Bragaglia as Il viaggiatore nervoso 
Anna Carena as La maestra sulla corriera 
Pina Gallini as Signora Clelia 
Luciano Manara as Il settentrionale 
Armando Migliari as Antonio, il capostazione

Release
The film premiered in Italy on 23 December 1942. It was released in the United States on 20 November 1948.

Reception
The New York Times wrote in 1948: "Although the Italian film artisans have been garnering justifiable acclaim here for the biting realism of their topical portraits, kudos has not been the rule where other themes were concerned. So it is pleasant to report that Four Steps in the Clouds rates a round of applause for its sensitive treatment of a thoroughly unspectacular subject." The critic described Cervi's performance as "a beautifully wrought characterization" and Benetti's as "finely etched" and "poignant". Concerning the storyline, the critic wrote that "the improbability is outweighed by the performances of the cast and adeptness of direction, which makes Four Steps in the Clouds both believable and diverting."

Jacek Klinowski and Adam Garbicz covered the film in their 2012 book Feature Cinema in the 20th Century, where they assessed it as a break from the "banal" cinema of Blasetti's preceding period, and a return to a style he had employed ten years before, which they described as "innovative". Klinowski and Garbicz acknowledged that Four Steps in the Clouds, and Blasetti in general, had been important in the development of the Italian neorealist movement, but came up with several reservations about the film, and wrote how they would have preferred if the neorealists to a greater extent had been inspired by Luchino Visconti's Ossessione instead of Blasetti's films. The critics wrote about Four Steps in the Clouds:
Especially the first part of Blasetti's comedy, which takes place in a crowded bus, comes across (despite its unrefined observations) as a striking novelty and a veritable photograph of life. But the fact remains that the director seems to have been carried away by his enthusiasm, although Four Steps in the Clouds is certainly a film of quality. Its second lyrical-nostalgic part is not weaker that the first, although with its popular-generic tone it shows only the surface of events and reduces feelings to simple opposites: dislike and friendship, obstinacy and tolerance, despair and joy.

Remakes
The film was remade as The Virtuous Bigamist in 1956, as A Walk in the Clouds in 1995, as Mungarina Minchu in 1997 , as Pooveli in 1998 , as Alludugaaru Vachcharu  in 1999 and as Dhai Akshar Prem Ke  in 2000.

References

External links
 

1942 comedy-drama films
1942 films
Italian black-and-white films
Italian comedy-drama films
1940s Italian-language films
Films directed by Alessandro Blasetti
Films with screenplays by Cesare Zavattini
Films set in Lazio
Films scored by Alessandro Cicognini
Films shot at Cinecittà Studios
1940s Italian films